Sorbicillactone A is a bio-active isolate of a sponge-derived fungus.

References

Lactones
Heterocyclic compounds with 2 rings